Brian Ross (born January 14, 1962) is an American racecar driver. He won Rookie of the Year honors in the Automobile Racing Club of America in 2000 and won the CRA Kendall Late Model Series in 1999 and 2001. He has two career starts in the NASCAR Craftsman Truck Series starts, both in 2002. In 2012, Brian Ross won his first ever track championship at Plymouth Speedway. 

Ross was also the USAR Hooters Pro Cup Series rookie of the year and northern division champion in 2002.  That year he earned 5 wins. Ross was the 1999 winner of the annual Winchester 400.

Motorsports career results

NASCAR
(key) (Bold – Pole position awarded by qualifying time. Italics – Pole position earned by points standings or practice time. * – Most laps led.)

Busch Series

Craftsman Truck Series

References

External links
 

ARCA Menards Series drivers
American Speed Association drivers
Living people
NASCAR drivers
CARS Tour drivers
1962 births
People from Plymouth, Indiana
Racing drivers from Indiana